Sultana Frizell (born 24 October 1984) is a Canadian track and field athlete competing in the hammer throw.  Frizell currently trains under the guidance of Derek Evely in Kamloops, British Columbia.  She competed at the 2008 Olympic Games in Beijing and the 2012 Olympic Games in London. Frizell is the former Commonwealth Games champion in the hammer throw and Commonwealth Games record holder for the event as well.

Career
Frizell was born in Perth, Ontario and started her athletic career in figure skating before taking up track and field in high school.  While attending Perth and District Collegiate Institute, she competed in the shot put, discus, javelin, and hammer throw.  She won gold medals in hammer and shot put and silver in discus at 2003 Canadian junior championships.  She also took fourth in the hammer and sixth in shot put at 2003 Pan Am junior championships.  Although she set a Canadian High School Record in the shot put, she ultimately decided to focus on the hammer throw.

Frizell graduated from high school in 2003 and immediately enrolled at the University of Georgia where she competed for three seasons.  In her first season, Frizell showed tremendous improvement.  She placed ninth at the NCAA Championships and third at the Canadian Track and Field Championships.  She also improved her personal bests in the shot put and javelin.  She finished the season with a best of 63.36 meters in the hammer throw.  In 2005, Frizell improved her best to 66.42 meters.  She improved her placing at both the NCAA Championships and Canadian Championships, finishing sixth and second respectively.

For the 2006 season, Frizell returned to her native Ontario to train.  She continued to progress and won her first Canadian national title in 2007.  She also qualified for the 2007 Pan American Games where she placed seventh.  On November 1, 2007, Frizell relocated to Kamloops, British Columbia to train under the guidance of former world record holder Anatoliy Bondarchuk.  During the 2008 season, Frizell broke the Canadian senior women's hammer throw record four times and improved her personal best by over three meters.  Her personal best throw of 70.94 meters was in July 2008 at the Canadian Track and Field Championships in Windsor, Ontario.  That mark qualified her for the 2008 Olympic Games in Beijing, where she placed 33rd out of 50 competitors.

Repeat Commonwealth champion
Frizell came back even stronger during the 2009 season and set two more national records.  She also qualified for her first World Championships final and placed tenth in Berlin at the 12th IAAF World Championships in Athletics. In 2010, she set another national record of 72.24 meters came at the Fränkisch-Crumbach Hammer Meeting in Germany. She concluded her season with a gold medal and meet record performance at the Commonwealth Games in Delhi. The following year, Frizell won a silver medal at the 2011 Pan American Games. This event fell on her birthday, thus Frizell was able achieve a personal gift for herself.

The 2012 Summer Olympics in London were a disappointment for Frizell, as her first and best throw did not count due to a glitch in the computerized measuring system. Her following two throws also failed to count and she did not qualify for the finals. At the 2014 Commonwealth Games in Glasgow Frizell broke her own Games record three times, throwing a high of 71.97 metres to defend her Commonwealth Games title. She was named Canada's flag-bearer for the Games' closing ceremonies.

Honours
In 2012 Frizell was awarded the Queen Elizabeth II Diamond Jubilee Medal.

Achievements

References

External links
 
 
 
 
 
 

1984 births
Living people
Canadian female hammer throwers
Commonwealth Games gold medallists for Canada
Athletes (track and field) at the 2008 Summer Olympics
Athletes (track and field) at the 2011 Pan American Games
Athletes (track and field) at the 2012 Summer Olympics
Olympic track and field athletes of Canada
People from Perth County, Ontario
Athletes (track and field) at the 2010 Commonwealth Games
Athletes (track and field) at the 2014 Commonwealth Games
Athletes (track and field) at the 2018 Commonwealth Games
Athletes (track and field) at the 2015 Pan American Games
World Athletics Championships athletes for Canada
Pan American Games silver medalists for Canada
Pan American Games bronze medalists for Canada
Commonwealth Games medallists in athletics
Pan American Games medalists in athletics (track and field)
Track and field athletes from Ontario
Female weight throwers
Canadian Track and Field Championships winners
Medalists at the 2011 Pan American Games
Medalists at the 2015 Pan American Games
Medallists at the 2010 Commonwealth Games
Medallists at the 2014 Commonwealth Games